André Lischke (born 1952 in Paris) is a French musicologist and translator, specialising in Russian classical music.

Biography 
André Lischke was born into a family of Russian immigrant musicians. He began his musical education at the piano. After courses in musical composition, he turned to musicology with Michel Guiomar at the Schola Cantorum, then with Norbert Dufourcq and Yves Gérard at the Conservatoire de Paris, where he obtained his first prize. He specialized in Russian music and passed his doctoral thesis at the Sorbonne with Tchaikovski au miroir de ses écrits  for subject (1996).

As a journalist and music critic, he collaborates with magazines such as Diapason, L'Avant-scène opéra and Lyrica. He is also a producer of radio programs.

Between 1989 and 1997, he was artistic director of the record label Le Chant du Monde, a company soon bought over by Harmonia Mundi.

Since 2001, André Lischke has been teaching at the University of Evry where he runs a research laboratory: RASM, or research performing arts and music, which is unique in its kind.

Writings

Monographs

Direction

Translations

References

External links 
 Short biography on France Inter
 André Lischke on France Culture
 André Lischke on operadeparis.fr
 André Lischke on Fayard

1952 births
Living people
Writers from Paris
Russian–French translators
20th-century French musicologists
21st-century French musicologists
French radio producers